Yasameen Al-Raimi (born 26 November 1985) is a Yemeni sports shooter. She competed in the women's 10 metre air pistol event at the 2020 Summer Olympics.

References

External links
 

1985 births
Living people
Yemeni female sport shooters
Olympic shooters of Yemen
Shooters at the 2020 Summer Olympics
Place of birth missing (living people)